Godfrey Castro (born April 20, 1985) is an amateur boxer from the Philippines who competed in the Light Flyweight (-48 kg) division at the 2006 Asian Games winning the bronze medal in a lost bout in the semifinals against Thailand's Suban Pannon 20-40.

At the 2nd Olympic qualifier he lost his 3rd place bout to Jitender Kumar and didn't qualify.

References

1985 births
Living people
Asian Games medalists in boxing
Boxers at the 2006 Asian Games
Filipino male boxers
Asian Games bronze medalists for the Philippines

Medalists at the 2006 Asian Games
Southeast Asian Games medalists in boxing
Southeast Asian Games silver medalists for the Philippines
Competitors at the 2007 Southeast Asian Games
Light-flyweight boxers